Explanatory Dictionary of the Russian Language is a lexicographic group name for dictionaries. The definition "explanatory" word does not necessarily appear in the title name of these vocabularies. Among the most known explanatory dictionaries of the Russian language are:
Explanatory Dictionary of the Live Great Russian language, AKA Dahl's Explanatory Dictionary, 4 volumes, Russian Empire, 1st edition 1863–1866
Explanatory Dictionary of the Russian Language (Ushakov), 4 volumes, USSR, 1935–1940
Dictionary of the Russian Language (Ozhegov), 1 volume, USSR, 1st edition 1949

Russian dictionaries